St. Helena is an  American Viticultural Area (AVA) located within Napa Valley, centered in and around the town of St. Helena, California. It was established by the Bureau of Alcohol, Tobacco and Firearms (ATF) on October 11, 1995, after the ATF received a petition from Mr. Charles A. Carpy, Chairman of the St. Helena Appellation Committee, proposing to establish a new viticultural area in Napa County to be known as "St. Helena."

Geography 
The appellation covers  along the flat narrow land towards the northern end of the valley between the Vaca and Mayacamas Mountains. Its soil is mostly loam with good water retention and varying amounts of gravel.

Climate 
The area has a Warm-summer Mediterranean climate, and is somewhat hotter than nearby wine growing regions with summer temperatures that often reach the mid 90s Fahrenheit. It receives approximately 40 inches of rainfall per year.

History 
In 1860, George Belden Crane planted Mission vines in St. Helena, and the vineyard produced its first wine in 1862. By 1874, the vineyard produced 500,000 gallons of wine annually. Charles Krug, one of pioneers of Napa Valley winemaking, founded his winery in 1861 in the St. Helena district. Krug also established the St. Helena Viticultural Club in 1876.

On October 11, 1995, St. Helena AVA was established by the Bureau of Alcohol, Tobacco and Firearms (ATF). The AVA hosts more than 93 wineries with about  cultivated.

Viticulture 
The region is known for its red wines, including Zinfandel, Petite Sirah and Pinot noir, although white wines are also produced there such as Chardonnay. Its terroir is particularly well suited to Bordeaux, particularly Sauvignon Blanc. St. Helena's Cabernet Sauvignon is noted for its quality.

References

External links

  TTB AVA Map

American Viticultural Areas of the San Francisco Bay Area
Napa Valley
St. Helena, California
Geography of Napa County, California
1995 establishments in California
American Viticultural Areas